In Greek mythology, Philomela is identified by Gaius Julius Hyginus as the wife of Menoetius and mother of Patroclus. The former was one of the Argonauts and the latter a participant of the Trojan War. However, the Bibliotheca listed three other wives of Menoetius and possible mothers of Patroclus:
Periopis, daughter of Pheres, founder of Pherae
Polymele, daughter of Peleus, King of Phthia and an older half-sister to Achilles and
Sthenele, daughter of Acastus and Astydameia.

In some accounts, Damocrateia, daughter of Aegina and Zeus was also called the wife of Menoetius and mother of Patroclus.

Notes

References 

 Apollodorus, The Library with an English Translation by Sir James George Frazer, F.B.A., F.R.S. in 2 Volumes, Cambridge, MA, Harvard University Press; London, William Heinemann Ltd. 1921. . Online version at the Perseus Digital Library. Greek text available from the same website.
Gaius Julius Hyginus, Fabulae from The Myths of Hyginus translated and edited by Mary Grant. University of Kansas Publications in Humanistic Studies. Online version at the Topos Text Project.
 Tzetzes, John, Allegories of the Iliad translated by Goldwyn, Adam J. and Kokkini, Dimitra. Dumbarton Oaks Medieval Library, Harvard University Press, 2015. 

Women in Greek mythology
Locrian characters in Greek mythology

ja:ピロメーラー